Dark Mountain, formerly also known as Black Mountain, is a mountain in the Tanzilla Plateau of the Northern Interior of British Columbia, Canada, located northeast of the settlement of Dease Lake, near Cry Lake.

Before 1937 Dark Mountain was known as Black Mountain. The Canadian Geological Survey recommended a name change to avoid confusion with several similarly named features, see Black Mountain (disambiguation).

See also
List of Northern Cordilleran volcanoes
List of volcanoes in Canada
Volcanic history of the Northern Cordilleran Volcanic Province
Volcanism of Canada
Volcanism of Western Canada

References

Cassiar Country
One-thousanders of British Columbia
Volcanoes of British Columbia
Subglacial mounds of Canada
Stikine Plateau
Pleistocene volcanoes
Northern Cordilleran Volcanic Province